Roger Thomas Benitez (born December 30, 1950) is a senior United States district judge of the U.S. District Court for the Southern District of California. He is known for his opinions striking down several California gun control laws.

Early life and education
Born in Havana, Cuba, Benitez received an Associate of Arts degree from Imperial Valley College in 1971, a Bachelor of Arts degree from San Diego State University in 1974, and a Juris Doctor from the Western State University College of Law's San Diego campus (now the Thomas Jefferson School of Law) in 1978.

Legal career 
Benitez worked in private practice in Imperial County, California, from 1978 to 1997. He was a judge on the California Superior Court from 1997 to 2001, and an instructor for Imperial Valley College from 1998 to 1999.

Federal judicial service 
In 2001, Benitez was appointed by the United States District Court for the Southern District of California to serve as a United States magistrate judge. On May 1, 2003, he was nominated by President George W. Bush to a new seat on the Southern District of California created by 116 Stat. 1758. Benitez was confirmed by the United States Senate on June 17, 2004, by a 98–1 vote. Benitez received his commission on June 21, 2004.

Benitez was confirmed despite overwhelming opposition from the American Bar Association's Standing Committee on the Federal Judiciary, which rates the qualifications of judicial nominees. A substantial majority of the committee rated Benitez "not qualified" and a minority rated him as "qualified." In 2004 testimony to the Senate Judiciary Committee, the ABA committee investigator reported that, "Interviewees repeatedly told me that Judge Benitez displays inappropriate judicial temperament with lawyers, litigants, and judicial colleagues; that all too frequently, while on the bench, Judge Benitez is arrogant, pompous, condescending, impatient, short-tempered, rude, insulting, bullying, unnecessarily mean, and altogether lacking in people skills." Benitez's nomination was nevertheless supported by both of California's senators and was the outcome of a bipartisan commission established by Senators Dianne Feinstein and Barbara Boxer.

Benitez assumed senior status on December 31, 2017. He became a member of the Judicial Panel on Multidistrict Litigation in 2020.

Notable opinions and rulings 
Benitez is known for his opinions striking down several California gun control laws.

In 2019, Benitez granted summary judgment in a lawsuit (initially Duncan v. Becerra, later Duncan v. Bonta) in which plaintiffs challenged California's ban on high-capacity magazines. California Attorney General Xavier Becerra appealed the ruling to the Ninth Circuit. In 2020, a three-judge panel affirmed Benitez's grant of summary judgment in a 2–1 decision authored by Judge Kenneth Lee. However, the Ninth Circuit granted a petition for rehearing en banc review and vacated the panel decision. In November 2021, following en banc review, the Ninth Circuit reversed Benitez's decision.  On June 30, 2022 the US Supreme Court vacated the 9th circuit court of appeals en banc decision and remanded it for reconsideration in light of the New York State Rifle and Pistol Association v.  Bruen ruling.

In Rhode v. Becerra, Benitez issued a preliminary injunction blocking enforcement of California's 2016 Proposition 63 law requiring background checks for ammunition sales, ruling in favor of the California Rifle & Pistol Association; he deemed the law "constitutionally defective."  The Ninth Circuit stayed Benitez's ruling pending appeal.

Benitez presided over the lawsuit Miller v. Bonta in 2021; the case challenged California's assault weapons ban. Following a trial, Benitez overturned the 32-year-old state law, ruling that "the state's definition of illegal military-style rifles unlawfully deprives law-abiding Californians of weapons commonly allowed in most other states"; he issued a permanent injunction, but stayed it for 30 days to give state Attorney General Rob Bonta time to appeal. Benitez opened his opinion by stating, "Like the Swiss Army Knife, the popular AR-15 rifle is a perfect combination of home defense weapon and homeland defense equipment. Good for both home and battle, the AR-15 is the kind of versatile gun that lies at the intersection of the kinds of firearms protected under District of Columbia v. Heller, 554 U.S. 570 (2008) and United States v. Miller, 307 U.S. 174 (1939)." In Heller, the Supreme Court decision that struck down a District of Columbia handgun ban, associate justice Antonin Scalia held that the Second Amendment gives citizens a right to own weapons "in common use", but explained its limitations by citing "the historical tradition of prohibiting the carrying of 'dangerous and unusual weapons'," such as "weapons that are most useful in military service – M-16 rifles and the like."  Benitez held that the AR-15 passed the Heller test, stating that "The overwhelming majority of citizens who own and keep the popular AR-15 rifle and its many variants do so for lawful purposes, including self-defense at home." Benitez vocalized his disapproval of the measure in his ruling and expressed doubt that it had assisted in reducing the number of deaths inflicted by AR-15 variants, stating "More people have died from the Covid-19 vaccine than mass shootings in California." A three-judge panel of the Ninth Circuit Court of Appeals issued a stay of Benitez's ruling on June 21, 2021, leaving the ban in place as appeals were litigated.

On December 19, 2022, Benitez declared the fee-shifting provision of SB 1327 unconstitutional.

On February 28, 2023, a compliant was filed against him over his handling of a hearing in which he ordered the defendant's daughter to be handcuffed.

See also
 List of Hispanic/Latino American jurists

References

External links
 

1950 births
Living people
20th-century American lawyers
20th-century American judges
21st-century American lawyers
21st-century American judges
California state court judges
Cuban emigrants to the United States
Hispanic and Latino American judges
Judges of the United States District Court for the Southern District of California
People from Havana
San Diego State University alumni
Superior court judges in the United States
Thomas Jefferson School of Law people
United States magistrate judges
United States district court judges appointed by George W. Bush
American judges of Cuban descent